Streptomyces spinoverrucosus is a bacterium species from the genus of Streptomyces which has been isolated from air in Kuwait. Streptomyces spinoverrucosus produces salinazinone A, salinazinone B, galvaquinone A, galvaquinone B, galvaquinone C, spithioneine A, spithioneine B and anthraquinones.

See also 
 List of Streptomyces species

References

Further reading

External links
Type strain of Streptomyces spinoverrucosus at BacDive -  the Bacterial Diversity Metadatabase

spinoverrucosus
Bacteria described in 1982